Chiy-Talaa is a village in Osh Region of Kyrgyzstan. It is part of the Alay District. Its population was 2,114 in 2021.

Nearby towns and villages include Kichi-Karakol and Jerge-Tal.

References 

Populated places in Osh Region